Minuscule 526 (in the Gregory-Aland numbering), 610 (Scrivener's numbering), ε 1127 (in the Soden numbering), is a Greek minuscule manuscript of the New Testament, on a parchment, dated to the 11th century.

The manuscript was adapted for liturgical use. It is lacunose.

Description 

The codex contains the text of the Gospel of Luke 23:38-50; 24:46-53; Gospel of John 1:30-3:5 on 6 parchment leaves (size ). It is written in one column per page, 21 lines per page.

There is a division according to the Ammonian Sections (with a Harmony), but there is no references to the Eusebian Canons.

Text 

The Greek text of the codex is a representative of the Byzantine text-type. Aland placed it in Category V.
Wisse did not examine this manuscript by using his profile method, because it has not in Luke chapters 1, 10, and 20.

History 

The manuscript has been dated by the INTF on the palaeographical ground to the 11th century.

In the 15th century the manuscript was bound in a book of other matter, on a paper.

The manuscript was added to the list of New Testament minuscule manuscripts by F. H. A. Scrivener (610) and C. R. Gregory (526).

The manuscript is currently housed at the Bodleian Library (MS. Barocci 59) in Oxford.

See also 

 List of New Testament minuscules
 Biblical manuscript
 Textual criticism

References

Further reading

External links 
 MS. Barocci 59 Images available on Digital Bodleian

Greek New Testament minuscules
11th-century biblical manuscripts
Bodleian Library collection